The FATA Cheetahs was a limited overs cricket team based in FATA, Pakistan. The team was established during 2013-14 Faysal Bank T20 Cup.

Squad

 Riaz Afridi - Captain
 Abdul Manan
 Almar Afridi
 Asad Afridi
 Asif Afridi
 Asif Ali
 Ibrahim Gul
 Inamullah
 Khushdil Shah
 Muhammad Aslam
 Muhammad Irfan
 Muhammad Naeem
 Rehan Afridi
 Sabyar Afridi
 Saeed Khan
 Shakeel Shah
 Zakir Afridi
 Zeeshan Khan

Result summary

T20 results

Captains' record

Sponsor
2013-14 kit sponsors of the FATA team was Nobel TV.

See also
 Pakistan Super League
 Federally Administered Tribal Areas cricket team

References

External links
Twenty 20 Record page for FATA Cheetas

Cricket clubs established in 2013
2013 establishments in Pakistan
Cricket teams in Pakistan
Cheetas